Jean-Ovide Decroly (Ronse, 23 July 1871 – Uccle, 10 September 1932) was a Belgian teacher and psychologist.

He studied medicine at the University of Ghent, with half a year at the University of Berlin where he studied the action of toxins and antitoxins on general nutrition in 1898. He later worked with (mentally) handicapped children at the neurological clinic in Brussels.

Decroly founded The Hermitage School in 1907. He was a freemason, and a member of the lodge Les Amis Philanthropes of the Grand Orient of Belgium in Brussels. Nowadays the "Ecole Decroly" (based in Uccle, Brussels, a school reaching from kindergarten to baccalaureate) is following his pedagogical approach.

The Decroly plan 
The "Decroly plan" lays ground rules for social adaptation of a biological organism, in the concrete case, children. It concludes that schooling is needed for children to meet their "biosocial needs".  Followers of Decroly have gone on to create and start schools that primarily focus on these "biosocial needs", and better augment the student's educational experience.  These visionary teachers include such people as Yomila Aguirre, Fannael Harrison and Catherine Gavin, who have founded prestigious schools such as Out-of-Door Academy.

Quotes 
 To educate in its fullest sense is to create conditions in which the child can live - and is led by these conditions led to live-as fully as possible through each succeeding stage of his development, meeting and solving in his own experience the problems of each stage as it comes, and so gaining the power to meet and to solve the problems that await him in further stages. Such conditions it is for a school to provide. (Decroly cited by J.H. Badley, Dr. Ovide Decroly  ed. Albert Decordier, Amicale Rijksbasisonderwijs, Ronse, Belgium)

External links
 

Biography
Ecoledecroly in Uccle (Brussels)
Ovide Decroly, A hero of education, Van Gorp

Belgian educators
Belgian educational theorists
1871 births
1932 deaths
Belgian psychologists
People from Ronse